Milford Mill Academy (MMA) is a four-year public high school in Baltimore County, Maryland, United States. It is located on the west side of the county close to the Baltimore City border just outside the Baltimore Beltway.

About the School
Milford Mill Academy is located on 3800 Washington Avenue in Milford Mill, Maryland.  The school was named after the area, which was called Milford where a local mill was a large part of the economy.  In 1992, after several years of modernization, students returned to the school after being housed at a temporary facility.  The school then renamed itself Milford Mill Academy, after being named Milford Mill High School for many years.  The school borders three other high schools in Baltimore County that were built due to overcrowding at Milford Mill- Pikesville High School, Woodlawn High School, and Randallstown High School.

The school originally was a junior/senior high school. The area of the county when Milford opened its doors in 1949 was mostly rural.  In the early and mid 1950s, the school became overcrowded, forcing the county to build a separate junior high (Sudbrook; grades 7-9)and the renamed high school dropped the "Junior" from its name.

Academics
Milford Mill Academy received a 44.2 out of a possible 90 points (49%) on the 2018-2019 Maryland State Department of Education Report Card and received a 3 out of 5 star rating, ranking in the 27th percentile among all Maryland schools.

Students
The 2019–2020 enrollment at Milford Mill High School was 1251 students.

Athletics

State Championships
Football
Class C 1987
Volleyball
Class A 1978
Girls Basketball
3A 2005, 2014, 2015
Mildred Haney Murray Sportsmanship Award 1998
Boys Basketball
Class C 1988
1A 1992, 1994
3A 2010, 2011, 2013
Girls Indoor Track
Class B-C 1984, 1985
3A-2A 2002, 2003
Boys Indoor Track
Class A 1981 TIE
Class B-C 1982, 1983, 1987
3A-2A 1997
3A 2015
Baseball
Class B 1984
Girls Track and Field
Class C 1988 TIE
1A 1991
3A 2015
Boys Track and Field
Class C 1988
1A 1989, 1992

Notable alumni
Howard Ashman - Oscar-winning songwriter
Victor Blackwell - class of 1999- television personality
Ira Glass - public radio personality
 Brian Jordan - professional baseball and football player
  Marlon Jones- class of 1982 - former NFL professional, DT, Cleveland Browns (1987-1989)
Maysa Leak- jazz musician, producer, educator
Isaiah Miles (born 1994) - basketball player in the Israeli Basketball Premier League
Mo'Nique - class of 1985 - actress/comedy
Ricky Porter - class of 1978 - former NFL professional, RB, Detroit Lions, 1982, Baltimore Colts, 1983, Buffalo Bills, 1987.
Reggie E. White- class of 1988 - NFL professional DT, San Diego Chargers, (1992-1994) and present Milford Head Football Coach
Mario (singer)
Michele S. Jones - the first woman in the United States Army Reserve to reach the position of command sergeant major of the U.S. Army Reserve.
Kamaria Muntu - Black Feminist poet, writer and arts activist. She is also Editor and Founder of Femficatio Literary Magazine.

References and notes

 See also List of Schools in Baltimore County, Maryland

External links

 Milford Mill Academy High School Homepage
 Milford Mill Academy on Google Street View

Milford Mill High School
Milford Mill High School
Milford Mill High School
Middle States Commission on Secondary Schools
International Baccalaureate schools in Maryland
Milford Mill, Maryland
1949 establishments in Maryland